Las Minas (Spanish: 'the mines') is a municipality in the Mexican state of Veracruz, located  northeast of the state capital Xalapa.

Geography
It borders the municipalities of Altotonga to the west and north, Tatatila to the east, Las Vigas de Ramírez to the south, and Villa Aldama to the southwest.

The land in Las Minas is mostly either forested (47%) or used as farmland (46%). The municipality is located in the Nautla River basin and the main stem of the Nautla flows through it from south to north. Known as the arroyo Borregos as it enters the municipality, it changes its name to the Trinidad River as it flows past the hydroelectric plant near the municipal seat, and then becomes the Bobos River as its course bends northwest on the municipality's border with Tatatila.

Las Minas's climate is generally temperate and humid.

History
The original name for the area was Zomelahuacan (Nahuatl: "slippery place of elderberries"). The discovery of rich mineral deposits in the area of Zomelahuacan and Tatatila dates back to 1680 and gold and copper mining took place in the 18th and 19th centuries. In 1803 the town of Las Minas de Zomelahuacan was founded; its name was eventually shortened to Las Minas.

On 1 December 1868, Las Minas became a municipality in the canton of Jalacingo in the state of Veracruz. On 28 October 1881 it was separated from Jalacingo and attached to the canton of Xalapa. It became a free municipality on 15 January 1918.

Administration
The municipal government comprises a president, a councillor (Spanish: síndico), and a trustee (regidor). The current president of the municipality is María Magdalena Hernández Condado.

Demographics
In the 2010 Mexican Census, the municipality of Las Minas recorded a population of 2897 inhabitants living in 614 households. The 2015 Intercensal Survey estimated a population of 2920 inhabitants in Las Minas, including 4.45% who reported being of Indigenous ancestry. 

There are 12 localities in the municipality, of which only the municipal seat, also called Las Minas, is classified as urban. It recorded a population of 235 inhabitants in the 2010 Census.

Economy and infrastructure
The main economic activity in Las Minas is farming. Corn, beans and coffee are the main crops grown, and pastures are maintained for the grazing of goats and sheep. Mineral exploration in the area is ongoing as of 2018. The Las Minas hydroelectric plant is located near the municipal seat and has a capacity of 15 MW.

References

Municipalities of Veracruz
1868 establishments in Mexico
States and territories established in 1868